James Cleland may refer to:

James Cleland (footballer) (1869–1942), Scottish footballer
James Cleland (politician) (1839–1908), Member of the Ontario Legislative Assembly
James Cleland (statistician) (1770–1840), Scottish statistician and historical writer
James T. Cleland, former Dean of Duke Chapel
James William Cleland (1874–1914), Scottish Liberal Party politician and barrister